Beaumont Newhall (June 22, 1908 – February 26, 1993) was an American curator, art historian, writer, photographer, and the second director of the George Eastman Museum.  His book The History of Photography remains one of the most significant accounts in the field and has become a classic photographic history textbook. Newhall was the recipient of numerous awards and accolades for his accomplishments in the study of photo history.

Childhood and education
Beaumont Newhall was born in Lynn, Massachusetts, United States, on June 22, 1908. He was the son of Herbert W. Newhall and Alice Lillia Davis. Some of his earliest childhood memories revolved around photography. He recalled watching his mother in her darkroom as she developed her own glass plate images as well as dipping his fingers into the chemical trays to see what they tasted like.

Although Newhall wanted to study film and photography in college, the subjects were not being taught as separate disciplines when he enrolled at Harvard University. Instead, he chose to study art history and museum studies.

While at Harvard, Newhall was greatly influenced by his instructor Paul J. Sachs. In 1932, after receiving his master's degree from Harvard,. Sachs helped Newhall obtain a position as lecturer at the Philadelphia Museum of Art in Philadelphia.

Newhall continued his graduate studies at the Institute of Art and Archaeology of the University of Paris, and the Courtauld Institute of Art in London.  He worked briefly for the Metropolitan Museum of Art in New York and the Massachusetts branch of the Public Works Administration. Because of financial difficulties during the Depression, Newhall was not able to devote himself to his doctoral studies, and eventually accepted a position at the Museum of Modern Art as a stable source of income.

Museum of Modern Art
Newhall's career at the Museum of Modern Art began in 1935 when he became its librarian. In 1937, he was invited by Alfred Barr Jr., the director of MoMA, to develop the first comprehensive retrospective of photographic works. The exhibition that Newhall mounted was pivotal in securing photography's place within the arts. Its accompanying catalog, The History of Photography, was the first account of the first 100 years of photographic history that gave equal credit to its technical virtues, as well as its value as an art form. Lewis Mumford in his review in The New Yorker, noted that Newhall, "who assembled the photographs and instruments for the Museum, did an admirable job in ransacking the important collections for historic examples" and praised his catalogue as "a very comprehensive and able piece of exposition; one of the best short critical histories I know in any language." The show toured 10 other American Museums and the catalogue long outlived the exhibition to become a significant resource.

In 1940, Newhall became the first curator of MoMA's photography department and decisively began collecting for the Museum, starting with the work of László Moholy-Nagy. Newhall married Nancy Wynne, a notable photography critic who worked in his place as curator at MoMA during his service in World War II, in which his rank was First Lieutenant. He was posted to Italy and North Africa as a photo-interpreter of aerials taken over enemy territory, and then returned to America to train others.

In 1946 Newhall was invited by Josef Albers to lecture on the history of photography at Black Mountain College. He resigned from the Museum in 1947 after he found that Edward Steichen was to direct the Photography Department over him, while he was to be curator. Nevertheless, he accepted a request to contribute an introduction to the MoMA exhibition catalogue for Henri Cartier-Bresson.

George Eastman Museum
Newhall received a Guggenheim Fellowship and used it to start a new edition of his The History of Photography, and also began research into the history of the daguerreotype in America, where its use had continued for a decade after its obsolescence in Europe. From 1948 was appointed curator of the George Eastman Museum, housed in the former residence of George Eastman, in Rochester, New York, to 1958, and was its director until 1971.  While at the Eastman Museum, Newhall was responsible for amassing one of the largest photographic collections in the world. He was joined there by Minor White who took over editorship of Image, the magazine Newhall issued from the Museum, which later passed on to Nathan Lyons who turned it into a respected quarterly. Newhall published books through the Museum including Edward Weston's Daybooks, co-published with Horizon press; Photographers on Photography edited by Lyons; and on Aaron Siskind. He served as an honorary trustee of the Eastman House until his death.

Educator, late career and death
Throughout his career, Newhall taught the history of photography and photography at institutions including the University of Rochester, Rochester Institute of Technology, State University of New York at Buffalo and at the Salzburg Seminar in American Studies in Austria.

In his late career after retiring from the George Eastman Museum he was appointed professor at the University of New Mexico in 1972 and  named Professor Emeritus in 1984.

Beaumont Newhall died in Santa Fe, New Mexico, on February 26, 1993. He was predeceased by his wife Nancy on July 7, 1974 from injuries she sustained when struck by a falling tree on the Snake River in Grand Teton National Park.

Library and Archives
The Getty Research Institute in Los Angeles, California houses the Beaumont and Nancy Newhall papers. The private research library of Beaumont and Nancy Newhall was donated to the College of Santa Fe (later Santa Fe University of Art and Design) in New Mexico before its closure in 2018.

Cookery writer
Newhall wrote 234 weekly food articles in his column  “Epicure Corner,” for the local New York paper, the Brighton-Pittsford Post from 1956–69. A collection of his writings and recipes was published in 2009 as Beaumont's Kitchen.

Awards
1970: The Cultural Award from the German Society for Photography (DGPh), with Leo Fritz Gruber
2005: Newhall was posthumously inducted into the International Photography Hall of Fame and Museum.

Publications

 (republication of vintage text)

Beaumont Newhall The Challenge of photography to this art historian. In

References

External links
 Oral history interview with Beaumont Newhall, 1965 Jan. 23 in the Smithsonian Archives of American Art

American art historians
American art critics
American art curators
1908 births
1993 deaths
Historians of photography
Photography critics
Photography curators
Photography academics
MacArthur Fellows
Harvard University alumni
Directors of George Eastman House
People associated with the Museum of Modern Art (New York City)
People from Lynn, Massachusetts
20th-century American historians
20th-century American male writers
20th-century American photographers
University of New Mexico faculty
Historians from Massachusetts
University at Buffalo faculty
American male non-fiction writers